Anastasiya Akimova (born 12 May 1991) is a Russian football defender who plays for Zvezda Perm of the Russian Championship. She played before for Rossiyanka having also represented the club in the UEFA Women's Champions League.

Akimova was included in the Russian national team's squad for the first matches of the 2013 European Championship qualifying campaign, and made her debut as a substitute in a 4–0 win over Greece.

She was not included in national coach Sergei Lavrentyev's squad for the final tournament in Sweden.

Honours

Club 
WFC Rossiyanka

Top Division (1): 2011–12

References

External links
 Club profile 

1991 births
Living people
Footballers from Moscow
Russian women's footballers
Russia women's international footballers
Russian Women's Football Championship players
WFC Rossiyanka players
Zvezda 2005 Perm players
Women's association football defenders
21st-century Russian women